Godinotia is an extinct genus of strepsirrhine primate belonging to the Adapidae family. It lived during the Eocene epoch (49 million years ago), and its fossils have been found in the Messel Pit, Germany.

Size
Godinotia were about 30 cm long, excluding the tail, smaller than a domestic cat.

Discovery and species
The genus is named after primate researcher Marc Godinot.

References

Literature cited 

Eocene primates
Prehistoric strepsirrhines
Prehistoric primate genera
Fossil taxa described in 2000
Eocene mammals of Europe